Usman Tariq Khawaja (born 18 December 1986) is a Pakistani-born Australian cricketer who represents Australia and Queensland. Khawaja made his first-class cricket debut for New South Wales in 2008 and played his first international match for Australia in January 2011. Khawaja was born in Pakistan and emigrated to Australia with his family at the age of four. He has played county cricket in the United Kingdom and briefly played in both the Indian Premier League and Pakistan Super League.

Early and personal life
Khawaja was born in Islamabad, Pakistan. His family emigrated to New South Wales when he was four. He became the first Australian of Pakistani origin to represent Australia in cricket when he made his debut in the 2010–11 Ashes series. He is a qualified commercial and instrument-rated pilot, completing a bachelor's degree in aviation from the University of New South Wales before he made his Test debut. He attained his basic pilot licence before his driving licence. He was educated at Westfields Sports High School. 

Usman Khawaja announced his engagement on 14 December 2016 on his Facebook page. and subsequently married his wife Rachel on 6 April 2018. Rachel Khawaja (née McLellan) converted to Islam prior to their wedding. Khawaja is a dual Australian and Pakistani citizen.

Domestic and T20 career

A left-handed top order batsman, Khawaja was awarded Player of the Australian Under-19 Championship in 2005 and also played for Australia in the 2006 U-19 Cricket World Cup in Sri Lanka as an opening batsman.

He made his first-class debut for the New South Wales Blues in 2008. In the same year, he hit consecutive double centuries for the NSW Second XI—a feat never before achieved by a NSW player. On 22 June 2010 it was announced by Cricket Australia that Usman Khawaja would be a part of the Australian touring squad to play Pakistan in a two Test series in England.

Since 2011 up until February 2022, Khawaja has played for the Sydney Thunder in the Big Bash League. In BBL05, he was the second highest run scorer (345 runs), with an average of 172.50.

Khawaja signed a contract to play for county side Derbyshire in the 2011 English domestic season. He played in four County Championship matches, averaging 39.87 with the bat and scoring a century (135) against Kent. After his county stint, he made five further Test appearances in 2011, scoring one half-century (65) against South Africa. He was dropped from Australia's Test team after the home series against New Zealand, making way for Shaun Marsh upon Marsh's return from injury.

Lancashire signed Khawaja as an overseas player for the 2014 county season for all formats. Khawaja scored 86 runs on his debut against Durham but in vain as Lancashire lost by 27 runs.

He plays club cricket for Valley District Cricket Club in Brisbane.

In August 2015, Khawaja was appointed as captain of the Queensland cricket team, replacing previous captain James Hopes.

In April 2018, he was signed by Glamorgan County Cricket Club to play in the 2018 Vitality Blast tournament in England. In April 2021, he was signed by Islamabad United to play in the rescheduled matches in the 2021 Pakistan Super League.

In February 2022, Khawaja opted out of his contract with the Sydney Thunder, citing "family reasons".

International career
Khawaja was selected as part of the 17-man Australian squad for the 2010–11 Ashes series. During the third Test, Ricky Ponting fractured his finger and Khawaja was named as a stand-by if Ponting could not recover in time. He was subsequently selected in the Australian cricket team to play in the fifth Test against England in Sydney on 3 January 2011. On 3 January 2011, Khawaja became the 419th Australian to be presented with an Australian Cricket Test baggy green cap. Khawaja became the first Muslim and first Pakistani-born Australian player to play Test cricket for Australia, and only the seventh foreign-born cricketer to do so in the last 80 years.

Before the third Test against India in March 2013, Australia suspended Khawaja, along with James Pattinson, Shane Watson and Mitchell Johnson following a breach of discipline. Michael Clarke, the captain, revealed that the step had been taken as a result of repeated infractions which led to Watson flying back home and contemplating Test retirement. Some former players reacted with astonishment at the decision taken by the team management. Khawaja made his Test return in the second Test of the 2013 Ashes series, replacing Ed Cowan.

In his first Test in more than two years, he scored his maiden Test century, in the first Test against New Zealand on 5 November 2015, in which he scored 174 with 16 fours and 2 sixes. He made this return in his tenth Test in the coveted number 3 position, helping Australia to an emphatic victory.

He made his Twenty20 International debut for Australia against India on 31 January 2016.

During the 2015–16 season, Khawaja was in spectacular form for Australia and his domestic T20 franchise the Sydney Thunder, with many pundits hailing his renaissance as a batsman since being dropped from the Australian team in 2013 and recovering from an injury in 2015. He also switched to using Kookaburra equipment.

Additionally, Khawaja set a record for becoming the first ever batsman to score a Test century in an innings of a Day-Night Test match on home soil and still has the record for the second highest individual score in a Day-Night Test innings.

Khawaja played his first Test match against the country of his birth, Pakistan, on 15 December 2016 at the Gabba. When asked about the significance of the match, he described a moment of confusion outside the change rooms:

"Funnily enough I was waiting downstairs and I needed the change room locker to be opened for us and I was just waiting and the Queensland Cricket lady came down. She was like 'Oh, you need the locker rooms open?' I went 'yes please' and she started walking to the Pakistani change room. I was like, 'No, I'm that way, thank you'.

In January 2017, Khawaja dabbed in celebration of his half-century scored in a Test match against Pakistan in Sydney. His move received mixed reactions, with some praising it, while others accused him of disrespecting his opponents.

In April 2018, he was awarded a national contract by Cricket Australia for the 2018–19 season. He played a match saving innings against Pakistan in the first Test in 2018 at Dubai.

In April 2019, he was named in Australia's squad for the 2019 Cricket World Cup. In Australia's final group-stage match, against South Africa, Khawaja picked up a hamstring injury, ruling him out of the rest of the tournament. Matthew Wade was named as cover for him.

In July 2019, he was named in Australia's squad for the 2019 Ashes series in England. In the series, he returned the scores of 13, 40, 36, 2, 8 and 23, failing to convince. Therefore, for the fourth Ashes Test, Steve Smith replaced Khawaja after returning from concussion, while Marnus Labuschagne retained his place in the side.

On 16 July 2020, Khawaja was named in a 26-man preliminary squad of players to begin training ahead of a possible tour to England following the COVID-19 pandemic. He was not included in the final squad for the tour.

In January 2022, Khawaja made a comeback to international cricket after a long hiatus, in the 4th Ashes Test at SCG; and made twin centuries in the match, posting scores of 137 and 101* respectively.

Khawaja was then selected for the Australian tour of Pakistan. He was the highest run scorer in the series scoring 496 runs at an average of 165.33, a performance which earned him player of the series. He scored 97 runs in the first innings of the first test. He then scored 160 runs in the first innings of the second test and 44* in the second innings. In the first innings of the third test, he scored 91 followed by 104* in the second innings, helping Australia win the final match of the series and as such the series as a whole.

In January 2023, in the third Test against South Africa, he completed his 4000 Test runs, and struck his career-best 195 runs. Khawaja capped off his return to international cricket by picking up the Shane Warne Test Player of the Year at the Allan Border Medal ceremony, ahead of Travis Head and Steve Smith. Khawaja was also awarded the Community Impact Award at the same event.

International centuries
Khawaja has scored 14 centuries in Test matches and two in One Day Internationals. His highest Test score of 195* came against South Africa at Sydney Cricket Ground, Sydney in January 2023 and his highest ODI score of 104 came against India at JSCA International Stadium, Ranchi in March 2019.

Test centuries

One Day International centuries

References

External links

 

1986 births
Australia One Day International cricketers
Australia Test cricketers
Australia Twenty20 International cricketers
Australian cricketers
Australian Muslims
Australian sportspeople of Pakistani descent
Cricketers from Brisbane
Cricketers from Islamabad
Cricketers from Sydney
Cricketers at the 2019 Cricket World Cup
Derbyshire cricketers
Lancashire cricketers
Living people
New South Wales cricketers
Pakistani emigrants to Australia
Queensland cricketers
Rising Pune Supergiant cricketers
Queensland cricket captains
Sydney Thunder cricketers
University of New South Wales alumni
People educated at Westfields Sports High School